The 2003 V8 Supercar Championship Series was a motor racing series for V8 Supercars. The series, which was the fifth V8 Supercar Championship Series, began on 22 March 2003 in Adelaide and ended on 30 November at Eastern Creek Raceway after 13 rounds. It ended with the awarding of the 44th Australian Touring Car Championship title by the Confederation of Australian Motor Sport to Tasmanian driver Marcos Ambrose. It was the first time a Stone Brothers Racing driver had won the championship and marked the first title win by a Ford driver since Glenn Seton in 1997, ending a five-year run by Holden Racing Team drivers.

Teams and drivers
The following drivers and teams competed in the 2003 V8 Supercar Championship Series. The series consisted of eleven rounds of sprint racing and two rounds (the Sandown 500 and the Bathurst 1000) of endurance racing with each car piloted by two drivers.

* = Drove in Sandown 500 only

** = Drove in Bathurst 1000 only

Driver changes
Jason Bright left the Holden Racing Team to join Team Brock.
Todd Kelly left the K-Mart Racing Team to join the Holden Racing Team replacing Jason Bright.
Rick Kelly left the Holden Young Lions to join the K-Mart Racing Team replacing his brother Todd Kelly.
Russell Ingall left Perkins Engineering to join Stone Brothers Racing replacing David Besnard.
David Besnard left Stone Brothers Racing to join Ford Performance Racing.
Craig Lowndes left 00 Motorsport to join Ford Performance Racing.
Greg Ritter returned to the Supercars Championship joining 00 Motorsport replacing Craig Lowndes.
Larry Perkins stepped down from full-time competition. He joined Steven Richards for the Enduro Rounds.
Mark Noske returned to the Supercars Championship joining ICS Team Ford for the Single Driver Rounds. He joined Mark Winterbottom for the Enduro Rounds. He was replaced by Professional Australian Rally Driver Neal Bates for the Enduro Rounds.
Jason Bargwanna left Garry Rogers Motorsport to join Larkham Motorsport.
Paul Radisich and Max Wilson effectively swapped seats, with Radisich moving to Briggs Motor Sport and Wilson to Dick Johnson Racing.
Jason Richards left Team Kiwi Racing to join Team Dynamik.
Craig Baird left Team Brock and replaced Jason Richards at Team Kiwi Racing.

Team changes
Ford Performance Racing expanded to a three car team.
Perkins Engineering scaled down to a two car team.
Following the collapse of Tom Walkinshaw Racing in February, the Holden Racing Team and Tom Walkinshaw Racing Australia entries were sold to Skaife Sports Pty Ltd and John Kelly Racing respectively.

Results and standings

Race calendar
The 2003 V8 Supercar Championship Series consisted of 13 rounds which included eleven sprint rounds of one, two or three races and two longer distance endurance races requiring two drivers per car.

Drivers championship
Drivers were required to drop the points earned at their worst round from their total, regardless of how many rounds were entered. Drivers who only entered one round lost all their points.

See also
 2003 V8 Supercar season

References

External links
 Official V8 Supercar site
 2003 Racing Results Archive 
 Images from the 2003 V8 Supercar Championship Series Retrieved from www.motorsport.com on 27 September 2009

Supercars Championship seasons
V8 Supercar Championship Series